Cam Thomas or Cameron Thomas may refer to:

 Cam Thomas (basketball) (born 2001), American basketball player
 Cam Thomas (cornerback) (born 1991), American football player, a cornerback
 Cam Thomas (defensive tackle) (born 1986), American football player, a nose tackle
 Cameron Thomas (linebacker) (born 2000), American football player, a linebacker